The sumo competition at the 2017 World Games took place from July 22 to July 23, in Wrocław in Poland, at the Orbita Hall.

Participating nations

Medal table

Men

Women

References

External links
 The World Games 2017
 Result Book

 
2017 World Games
2017